Gil Bastião Dias (born 28 September 1996) is a Portuguese professional footballer who plays as a winger or left-back for Bundesliga club VfB Stuttgart.

Club career

Early years
Born in Gafanha da Nazaré, Aveiro District, Dias played youth football with four clubs, including A.D. Sanjoanense from ages 12 to 17. He finished his development with S.C. Braga and, on 9 August 2014, played his first game as a professional with their reserves, coming on as a late substitute in a 1–0 away loss against C.D. Tondela in the Segunda Liga.

Monaco
Dias signed with AS Monaco FC in January 2015, going on to appear mostly for the reserve team during his tenure. On 6 January 2016, he was loaned out to Portuguese second division side Varzim S.C. until the end of the season.

For the 2016–17 campaign, still owned by Monaco, Dias joined Rio Ave FC. He made his Primeira Liga debut on 12 August 2016 in a 3–1 home loss against FC Porto, and scored his first goal in the competition on 18 September to help the hosts defeat Sporting CP 3–1.

Dias made his first appearance in Ligue 1 on 13 August 2017, when he came onto the field for the last minutes of the 4–1 away win over Dijon FCO. Two days later, he moved to ACF Fiorentina of the Serie A on a two-year loan deal with an obligation to buy at the end of the term.

On 23 June 2018, it was announced that Dias would join EFL Championship side Nottingham Forest on loan for the season, with an option to make the transfer permanent. He scored his first competitive goal on 29 August, helping the hosts beat Premier League club Newcastle United 3–1 in the second round of the EFL Cup.

On 24 January 2019, Dias moved to Super League Greece team Olympiacos F.C. on loan until 30 June 2020, with the option to make the transfer permanent afterwards. He scored his first goal on 6 February, netting from close range in a 3–3 away draw against PAS Lamia 1964 in the quarter-finals of the Greek Football Cup. Eight days later, in the UEFA Europa League's last-32 tie at home to FC Dynamo Kyiv, he chested the ball down before sending a half-volley past Denys Boyko from 25 yards for a final 2–2 draw.

Dias signed for La Liga club Granada CF on 31 January 2020, also in a temporary deal. In late September, he joined F.C. Famalicão on yet another loan.

Benfica
On 25 June 2021, Dias signed a five-year contract with S.L. Benfica for a €4 million fee. Mainly a reserve player, he scored his first goal on 17 April 2022 in a 2–0 victory at Sporting in the Derby de Lisboa, in injury time.

In the first part of the 2022–23 campaign, Dias made only two appearances as a substitute.

VfB Stuttgart
Dias joined Bundesliga club VfB Stuttgart on 30 January 2023, for roughly €1 million. He scored on his debut the following day, equalising an eventual 2–1 away win over SC Paderborn 07 in the round of 16 of the DFB-Pokal.

International career
Dias won his first cap for the Portugal under-21 side on 5 September 2017, in a 2–0 home win against Wales in the 2019 UEFA European Championship qualifiers. The following 27 March, for the same competition but this time as a substitute, he contributed one goal to the 4–2 victory in Switzerland.

Career statistics

References

External links

1996 births
Living people
Sportspeople from Aveiro District
Portuguese footballers
Association football wingers
Primeira Liga players
Liga Portugal 2 players
G.D. Gafanha players
A.D. Sanjoanense players
S.C. Braga B players
Varzim S.C. players
Rio Ave F.C. players
F.C. Famalicão players
S.L. Benfica footballers
Ligue 1 players
AS Monaco FC players
Serie A players
ACF Fiorentina players
English Football League players
Nottingham Forest F.C. players
Super League Greece players
Olympiacos F.C. players
La Liga players
Granada CF footballers
Bundesliga players
VfB Stuttgart players
Portugal youth international footballers
Portugal under-21 international footballers
Portuguese expatriate footballers
Expatriate footballers in Monaco
Expatriate footballers in Italy
Expatriate footballers in England
Expatriate footballers in Greece
Expatriate footballers in Spain
Expatriate footballers in Germany
Portuguese expatriate sportspeople in Monaco
Portuguese expatriate sportspeople in Italy
Portuguese expatriate sportspeople in England
Portuguese expatriate sportspeople in Greece
Portuguese expatriate sportspeople in Spain
Portuguese expatriate sportspeople in Germany